Pida or PIDA may refer to:

Phenyliodine(III) diacetate, a reagent used in organic chemistry
Pida, Nepal, a village
Pida (moth), a moth genus 
Pida (Pontus), a town of ancient Pontus, Anatolia
PIDA, an open source environment written in the Python language
PIDA (polymer), a molecule also known as poly(diiododiacetylene)
 Public Interest Disclosure Act 1998, a British whistleblower law